Makhanya is a surname. Notable people with the surname include:

Joseph Makhanya (born 1981), South African footballer
Leonard Makhanya (born 1964), Swazi boxer
Mapaseka Makhanya (born 1985), South African middle and long-distance runner
Mondli Makhanya, South African journalist
Sibonelo Makhanya (born 1996), South African cricketer

See also
Makhanya v Minister of Finance

Bantu-language surnames